Burton Edward Livingston (February 9, 1875 – February 8, 1948) was an American plant physiologist, born at Grand Rapids, Michigan. He was educated at the University of Michigan (B.S., 1898) and the University of Chicago (Ph.D., 1902), where he worked as an assistant from 1899 to 1905. He published Róle of Diffusion and Osmotic Pressure in Plants (1903). In 1913, Livingston became the professor of plant physiology at Johns Hopkins University. He also served on the board of trustees for Science Service, now known as the Society for Science and the Public, from 1930 to 1937.

1875 births
1948 deaths
American non-fiction writers
Plant physiologists
Johns Hopkins University faculty
Writers from Grand Rapids, Michigan
University of Michigan alumni
University of Chicago alumni
Society for Science & the Public
American botanists